Dyana Liu (born July 29, 1981) is an American actress. Liu is known for co-starring in the Cartoon Network live-action series Tower Prep.

Career
Liu was born in Taipei, Taiwan to a Hakka father and a Taiwanese mother, and she then grew up in Ithaca, New York. At age five, she began playing classical piano and did not pursue an acting career until college. She attended school at the University of Pennsylvania while also studying acting at the Walnut Street Theatre. After graduating from college, she returned to Ithaca to perform in local theater before moving to Los Angeles to pursue a career in film and television. She made her television acting debut guest-starring on an episode of The Unit. The next year, she co-starred in the independent western film Between the Sand and the Sky opposite Dee Wallace. In 2009, she appeared in the film Down for Life, which also starred Danny Glover. In 2010, she co-starred as Suki Sato in the Cartoon Network live-action series Tower Prep.

Filmography

References

External links

1981 births
Actresses from New York (state)
Actresses from Taipei
American film actresses
Taiwanese emigrants to the United States
American actresses of Chinese descent
American television actresses
American voice actresses
Living people
People from Ithaca, New York
University of Pennsylvania alumni
Taiwanese people of Hakka descent
American people of Chinese descent
American actresses of Taiwanese descent